José David Obregón (born 5 October 1978) is a Nicaraguan former professional boxer who competed from 2004 to 2008. As an amateur, he competed at the 2001 Central American Games.

Amateur career
At the 2001 Central American Games in Guatemala, he was eliminated in his opening bout against eventual silver medalist Carlos Hernández of El Salvador.

Professional career
On 19 March 2004, Obregón won his professional debut against the veteran Jimmy Desir at the Civic Center in Kissimmee, Florida.

After several big wins by knockout, Obregón took on Humberto Chavez (6-3-2) at the Miccosukee Resort & Gaming in Miami, Florida, and won by split decision over six rounds.

De La Rosa vs. Obregón
On 25 August 2006, Obregón lost to undefeated Mexican James de la Rosa.

References

External links

Nicaraguan male boxers
Welterweight boxers
Light-middleweight boxers
1978 births
Living people
People from Chontales Department
Nicaraguan emigrants to the United States
American male boxers